The 1931 Marshall Thundering Herd football team was an American football team that represented Marshall College (now Marshall University) as a member of the West Virginia Athletic Conference during the 1931 college football season. In its first season under head coach Tom Dandelet, the Thundering Herd compiled a 6–3 record (4–1 against conference opponents), won the WVAC championship, and outscored opponents by a total of 214 to 84. Ramey Hunter was the team captain.

Schedule

References

Marshall
Marshall Thundering Herd football seasons
Marshall Thundering Herd football